FC Vitebsk is a Belarusian football club based in Vitebsk. The club plays in the Belarusian Premier League, the top division in Belarusian football. Their home stadium is Vitebsky Central Sport Complex.

History 
The club was founded in 1960 as Krasnoye Znamya Vitebsk (Red Flag Vitebsk). They began playing in Soviet Class B (second-tier league) the same year. After three seasons, they relegated to the third tier. Vitebsk team would spend almost all of their subsequent Soviet-era seasons playing at the third level (Soviet Second League), with the exception of 1970 and 1990, when the team dropped to 4th level. The club went through several name changes. In 1963, they were renamed Dvina Vitebsk after local river. In 1985, the club was renamed Vityaz Vitebsk and in 1989   it was renamed KIM Vitebsk (both names relate to local industry companies).

In 1992 KIM joined Belarusian Premier League. During the 90s KIM (later renamed Dvina Vitebsk again in 1994 and Lokomotiv-96 Vitebsk in 1996) was one of the league top teams. They were league runners-up in 1992–93 and 1994–95, finished third in 1993–94 and 1997 and also won the Belarusian Cup in 1998. Since the 2000s, the club's results declined. They have relegated to the First League several times and promoted back and were never able to fight the title in later years. In 2003, they shortened their name to Lokomotiv Vitebsk and in 2006 to the current version, FC Vitebsk.

Name changes 
1960: founded as Krasnoye Znamya Vitebsk
1963: renamed Dvina Vitebsk
1985: renamed Vityaz Vitebsk
1989: renamed KIM Vitebsk
1994: renamed Dvina Vitebsk
1996: renamed Lokomotiv-96 Vitebsk
2003: renamed Lokomotiv Vitebsk
2006: renamed Vitebsk

Honours 
 Belarusian Premier League
 Runners-up (2): 1992–93, 1994–95
 3rd place (2): 1993–94, 1997
 Belarusian Cup
 Winners (1): 1998
 Runners-up (1): 2018–19

Current squad 
As of March 2023

League and Cup history

Soviet Union era 

1 Separate cup for 3rd level teams, different for each zone.
2 Relegated due to Class B (the league where Dvina was playing) changing its status from 3rd to 4th level in 1970, and the top two levels were reorganized into three with fewer teams.
3 Promoted due to 3rd level (Class A Second Group, renamed to Second League since next season) expansion from 3 to 6 territorial zones (from 66 to 124 teams) in 1971 and dismissal of 4th level.
4 In 1973 every draw was followed by a penalty shoot-out, with a winner gaining 1 point and loser gaining 0.
5 Despite finishing 13th from the 22 teams in 1989, KIM relegated as the Second League (3rd level) was reduced from 9 zones (195 teams) to 3 zones (66 teams) and the Second Lower League with 9 zones was introduced as a 4th level.

Belarus era 

1 Including additional game (2–1 win) against MTZ-RIPO Minsk for the 1st place as both teams finished with equal points.
2 Including additional game (1–4 loss) against MTZ-RIPO Minsk for the 14th place as both teams finished with equal points.
3 Lost relegation play-off to Partizan Minsk (0–2 away, 2–1 home)
4 Won promotion play-off against Dnepr Mogilev (2–0 home, 1–1 away)

FC Vitebsk in Europe 
Vitebsk played in European Cups under their former name Lokomotiv-96.

Managers 
 Pyotr Vasilevsky (1989–91)
 Georgy Kondratyev (2003–04)
 Andrey Chernyshov (2006–07)
 Yury Konoplev (2007–08)
 Alyaksandr Khatskevich (2008–09)
 Yury Konoplev (2009–10)
 Sergei Borovsky (2010–11)
 Yury Konoplev (2012–14)
 Sergey Vekhtev (2014–15)
 Sergey Yasinsky (2015–)

See also 
FC Vitebsk-2

References

External links 
Official Website 

 
Football clubs in Belarus
Sport in Vitebsk
1960 establishments in Belarus
Association football clubs established in 1960